The 2013 season was the Dallas Cowboys' 54th in the National Football League (NFL), their fifth playing home games at AT&T Stadium (formerly known as "Cowboys Stadium") and the third full season under head coach Jason Garrett. The Cowboys finished 8–8 for a third consecutive season, but missed the playoffs for a fourth consecutive season after losing their final game for the third straight season, this time to the Philadelphia Eagles.

2013 draft class

Notes
The Cowboys traded their original first-round (#18) selection to the San Francisco 49ers in exchange for first (#31) and (#74) third-round selections.
The Cowboys traded their seventh-round (#224) selection to the Miami Dolphins for offensive lineman Ryan Cook.

Staff

Rosters

Opening preseason roster

Week one roster

Final roster

Schedule

Preseason

Regular season

Note: Intra-division opponents are in bold text.

Game summaries

Week 1: vs. New York Giants

Week 2: at Kansas City Chiefs

Week 3: vs. St. Louis Rams

Week 4: at San Diego Chargers

Week 5: vs. Denver Broncos

Coming off their loss to the Chargers, the Cowboys hosted the Denver Broncos at home for an interconference duel. The Cowboys grabbed a 14–0 lead in the first quarter, with a 2-yard touchdown pass from quarterback Tony Romo to wide receiver Dez Bryant, followed by running back DeMarco Murray rushing for a 4-yard touchdown. The latter score occurred after a fumble by Broncos' wide receiver Eric Decker. The Broncos later got on the scoreboard, with quarterback Peyton Manning connecting on a 4-yard shovel pass to tight end Julius Thomas for a touchdown. Early in the second quarter, a 43-yard field goal by placekicker Dan Bailey gave the Cowboys a 17–7 lead. The Broncos then reeled off 21 unanswered points, with Manning adding two more touchdown passes — a 2-yarder to Decker and a 9-yarder to Thomas, followed by Manning rushing for a 1-yard touchdown on a bootleg play. A 48-yard field goal by Bailey at the end of the first half narrowed the Broncos' lead to 28–20.

In the second half, the Broncos added to their lead midway through the third quarter, with Manning connecting on a 2-yard touchdown pass to wide receiver Wes Welker. However, the Cowboys subsequently began chipping away at the Broncos’ lead, with Romo connecting on an 82-yard touchdown pass to wide receiver Terrance Williams. A 48-yard field goal by placekicker Matt Prater gave the Broncos a 38–27 lead, but the Cowboys further narrowed the Broncos' lead, with a 2-yard touchdown pass from Romo to Bryant (with an unsuccessful two-point conversion attempt). Following an intercepted Broncos' pass, the Cowboys subsequently re-claimed the lead early in the fourth quarter, with Romo throwing a 10-yard touchdown pass to tight end Jason Witten, coupled with a two-point pass from Romo to Williams. The Broncos tied the game at 41–41 on their next possession, with a 50-yard field goal by Prater. As the shootout continued, on the Cowboys' next possession, Romo connected on a 4-yard touchdown pass to wide receiver Cole Beasley to give the Cowboys a 48–41 lead with 7:19 remaining in the fourth quarter. 

Manning subsequently led the Broncos on a 9-play, 73-yard drive, which culminated with running back Knowshon Moreno rushing for a 1-yard touchdown to tie the game at 48–48 with 2:24 remaining in the fourth quarter. Two plays into the Cowboys' next possession, as the Cowboys were attempting a game-winning drive, Romo was intercepted by Broncos’ linebacker Danny Trevathan at the Cowboys' 24-yard line just before the two-minute warning. On the fourth play of the Broncos' final possession, the Broncos were facing a 3rd-and-1 at the Cowboys' 2-yard line, after the Cowboys had exhausted two of their three team timeouts. Moreno earned a crucial first down after Manning implored him to go down before reaching the goal line instead of scoring a touchdown, which forced the Cowboys to burn their final timeout with 1:35 remaining in the fourth quarter. After three kneel-downs by Manning, Prater nailed the game-winning 28-yard field goal as time expired. With the loss, the Cowboys moved to 2–3, and dropped to second place in the division. Romo passed for 506 yards in this shootout, and his 36 attempted passes is the fewest by any quarterback who managed to pass for 500 yards in one game.

Week 6: vs. Washington Redskins

Week 7: at Philadelphia Eagles

Week 8: at Detroit Lions

Dez Bryant was the topic of the close loss as he was engaged in several sideline rants throughout the second half.

Week 9: vs. Minnesota Vikings

Week 10: at New Orleans Saints

Week 12: at New York Giants

Dan Bailey's 34 yard field goal with 4 seconds left in the game gave the Cowboys their sixth win of the season. With the win, the Giants' four game winning streak was snapped and the Cowboys regained the top spot of the NFC East, remaining undefeated in the division.

Week 13: vs. Oakland Raiders
Thanksgiving Day game

Week 14: at Chicago Bears

Week 15: vs. Green Bay Packers

With the Packers coming off of their first win since the injury of Aaron Rodgers, the Cowboys lead 26–3 at halftime. In the second half of the game, the Packers managed a dramatic comeback that was helped by the mistake-prone Cowboys. The Packers scored the game-winning touchdown with almost a minute left in the game. Tony Romo tried to rally back and give the Cowboys a win, but threw an interception near the 50-yard line that sealed their fate. Controversy followed the game for the Cowboys giving up a 23-point halftime lead and the play-calling of the coaching staff.

Week 16: at Washington Redskins

After the loss to the Packers the week before, the Cowboys managed to hold the Redskins to only two field goals to lead 14–6 at halftime. In the third quarter, Kirk Cousins threw two touchdown passes to give the Redskins a 20–14 lead at the end of the 3rd. The Redskins extended their lead to 23–14 after another field goal. The Cowboys, in an attempt to not repeat the mistakes of the previous week, sent Dan Bailey out to kick a field goal to trail 23–17 in the 4th. At the 3:29 mark, the Cowboys went back to work to start at their own 13 yard line. Romo led the Cowboys downfield thanks in large part to a Terrance Williams 51 yard catch and then a Dez Bryant catch and run for 17 yards to set up first and goal at the Redskins' 4 yard line. DeMarco Murray carried the ball for all three plays (+3, no gain, −9). Facing 4th and goal at the Washington 10 yard line, Romo climbed the pocket and fired a pass to DeMarco Murray in the end zone to tie the game 23–23. With the extra point good, the Cowboys led 24–23 with 1:01 remaining in the game. Washington started their drive on their own 13 yard line after a 10-yard illegal block penalty negated what would have been a 21-yard return (to the Washington 23). Kirk Cousins and co. could not sustain their drive, totaling 4 yards on four passing attempts. The Redskins turned the ball over on downs with 40 seconds remaining in the game. Lining up in the victory formation, Tony Romo was able to kneel the ball down and run the clock out. With the win, the Cowboys advanced to 5-0 in the NFC East and kept their playoff hopes alive to set up a do-or-die at home versus the Eagles.

Romo was seen limping through most of the fourth quarter after rolling out of what would have been a sack by Redskins linebacker Rob Jackson. The Cowboys later confirmed injury reports of Romo suffering a herniated disc in his lower back. Despite statements that he would be ready to face Nick Foles and the Philadelphia Eagles for the NFC East Championship, Romo was placed on injured reserve. The Cowboys tried to delay surgery by administering an epidural injection two days prior to the anticipated game, but it was decided Romo needed the surgery and ended his season.

Week 17: vs. Philadelphia Eagles

The loss caused the Cowboys once again to miss out on the playoffs and gave them a 2–12 record in Week 17 games since 2000.

Standings

Division

Conference

References

External links
 
 

Dallas
Dallas Cowboys seasons
Dallas
2010s in Dallas
2013 in Texas